Cyclogomphus flavoannulatus is a species of dragonfly in the family Gomphidae. It is known only from the Western Ghats of India.

See also
 List of odonates of India
 List of odonata of Kerala

References

Gomphidae
Insects described in 2019